Arnold Meri (1 July 1919 – 27 March 2009) was a Soviet World War II veteran and the first Estonian Hero of the Soviet Union. After Estonia became independent, he was later charged with genocide for his role in the deportation of some Estonians to the inhospitable regions of the USSR. He was a first cousin of the President of Estonia, Lennart Meri. At the time of his death, Meri was an honorary chairman of the Estonian Anti-Fascist Committee.

Early life 
His parents were Konstantin, an Estonian, and Olga, a Russified German from Saint Petersburg, the daughter of a wealthy merchant. In 1926, due to economic reasons and political convictions, Meri's family emigrated to Yugoslavia, which was the main centre of the White emigrants. There, Arnold's father worked as a chef and his mother as a maid and young Arnold was baptised into the Russian Orthodox church and renamed Adrian. He completed Russian primary school in Skopje and at the Russian-Serbian Gymnasium in Belgrade in 1938. After returning to Estonia, he took a job as an intern at AS Franz Krull, but he was soon called on to serve in the auto-tank regiment of the Estonian military. After the Soviet occupation in 1940, he was elected to the City Komsomol Committee in Tallinn and was instructed to create a Komsomol organization in his Estonian army unit. After the absorption of his unit into the Red Army 22nd Estonian Territorial Rifle Corps, he was appointed a deputy political officer in the 415th Radio Battalion.

Military career 
After the start of Operation Barbarossa on 22 June 1941, the 22nd Estonian Territorial Rifle Corps retreated to the Porhov region. Meri was wounded four times during the battle while serving as a platoon commander in north-west Russia in 1941. In August 1941, he was awarded a Gold Star of the Hero of the Soviet Union for organizing the defense of the headquarters of the 22nd Estonian Territorial Rifle Corps when the German army broke through the lines near Dno in July 1941. In reality, the defense was commanded by captain Arnold Isotamm, but he was not deemed to be suitable for the decoration, as he was not a member of the Communist Party and had been an officer of the Estonian Army. Meri was specifically commended for remaining on the battlefield despite being wounded four times. Meri retired from the Red Army as a colonel. The building that housed the headquarters of the 22nd Estonian Rifle Corps in July 1941 is currently occupied by a secondary school. In 2008 the school was renamed in honour of Arnold Meri.

From 1945 to 1949, he served as the secretary of the central committee of the Leninist Young Communist League of Estonia. In 1948, he was awarded the highest Soviet order, the Order of Lenin. Meri's opinion on the Estonian part in World War II:

After the internal struggle within the Estonian Communist Party, which his "home communist" faction lost, he was stripped from his posts in 1950, then stripped of his honours and expelled from the party in 1951. In order to escape potential arrest, he settled in the Altai Republic with his new family. He was rehabilitated in 1956.

Involvement in deportation and the charge of genocide 

In 2003, the Estonia Security Police investigated Meri for participating in the deportations of Estonians in Hiiumaa in 1949. In August 2007, three months after the April Events, the Estonian Western Circuit Prosecutor's Office formally charged Arnold Meri with genocide, for his admitted role in organising the deportation of 251 Estonian civilians from the island of Hiiumaa to the Novosibirsk region of Siberia. According to the Prosecutor's Office, most of the deportees were women and children, and 43 subsequently died. Meri had acknowledged taking part in the deportations, but denied responsibility. According to the BBC, Estonia's claims that genocide took place is not widely accepted.

On 20 May 2008 the trial against Meri began. Meri pleaded not guilty. In his defense, Meri maintained that he was appointed to monitor the compliance of the process with then-current laws and to ensure that the punitive actions were limited to the individuals specifically listed by security services. Meri claimed that he was unable to control the abuses of the local authorities and withdrew from the process. For this decision he himself was prosecuted, stripped of his military honors and expelled from the Communist Party in 1949. Meri maintained that he was targeted by the current Estonian authorities in retaliation for his anti-fascist activities and harsh critique of the Estonian government.

In May 2008, the Russian Duma wrote to the European Parliament with a call to stop what they called a "shameful trial". The adopted statement in part read: "The trial is a purely political order to revise the results of WWII and to discredit the efforts of the anti-Hitler coalition to save mankind from the fascist plague". On 2 April 2009, the European Parliament passed the resolution on European conscience and totalitarianism.

Death 

Arnold Meri died in his sleep on 27 March 2009 at the age of 89. This automatically halted Meri's trial.

The President of Russia Dmitry Medvedev posthumously awarded Meri the Order of Honour within hours of Meri's death. In a telegram to Meri's widow, Yekaterina, Medvedev wrote "Arnold Meri was an exceptional and courageous figure, who devoted his entire life to the ideals of justice, freedom and humanism. Decorated with the Hero of the Soviet Union for his feats on the battlefields of the Great Patriotic War, he fought Nazism to the end of his days, and actively resisted attempts to rewrite history and whitewash those responsible for the twentieth century’s greatest tragedy, and their accomplices."

Meri was interred on 1 April 2009 in the Liiva cemetery on the outskirts of Tallinn in a funeral which was attended by several hundred people.

Awards
Hero of the Soviet Union
Two Order of Lenin
Order of the Patriotic War 1st and 2nd class
TwoOrder of the Red Banner of Labour
TwoOrder of the Red Star
Order of the Badge of Honor
Order of Friendship of Peoples
Order of Honour

References

External links

1919 births
2009 deaths
People from Tallinn
Estonian people of Baltic German descent
Members of the Central Committee of the Communist Party of Estonia
Members of the Supreme Soviet of the Estonian Soviet Socialist Republic, 1980–1985
Members of the Supreme Soviet of the Estonian Soviet Socialist Republic, 1985–1990
Second convocation members of the Supreme Soviet of the Soviet Union
Estonian military personnel
Estonian people of World War II
Soviet military personnel of World War II
People indicted for genocide
Anti-fascists
Soviet rehabilitations
Heroes of the Soviet Union
Recipients of the Order of Lenin
Recipients of the Order of the Red Banner of Labour
Recipients of the Order of Friendship of Peoples
Recipients of the Order of the Red Star
Recipients of the Order of Honour (Russia)
Burials at Liiva Cemetery